Jon Steven Cardin (born January 12, 1970) is an American politician from Maryland and a member of the Democratic Party. He currently serves in the Maryland House of Delegates, representing Maryland's District 11 in Baltimore County. He is a member of the Judiciary Committee and the chair of the Civil Proceedings Subcommittee. He previously represented the same district from 2003 through 2015. During that time he was a member of the Ways and Means Committee and chaired the Election Law Subcommittee. Cardin is the nephew of Ben Cardin, the senior United States senator from Maryland. In 2014, he ran for Attorney General of Maryland, but lost in the Democratic primary to state senator Brian Frosh.

Education
Cardin attended Tufts University for his undergraduate work and spent two years teaching Spanish at Mercersburg Academy. He returned to school to earn a Master of Policy Sciences degree from the University of Maryland, Baltimore County and a Masters of Arts degree in Judaic Studies from Baltimore Hebrew University, working before and after completion of the two degrees for the Baltimore Jewish Council and the Project Judaica Foundation. He again returned to school to earn a Juris Doctor degree from the University of Maryland School of Law. Cardin clerked for U.S. District Court Judge William D. Quarles, Jr. before full-time employment as an attorney.

House of Delegates
Cardin was elected to the House of Delegates in 2002, 2006, and 2010 and 2018. Previous to Cardin's 2002 election, his uncle Senator Ben Cardin, great uncle Maurice Cardin, and grandfather Meyer Cardin held the same seat. Cardin did not pursue reelection in 2014, as he ran for Attorney General of Maryland.

Cyberbullying
After the suicide of Howard County teenager Grace McComas was revealed to be the result of intense cyberbullying, Cardin introduced a bill that made it a misdemeanor to repeatedly and maliciously bully a minor through a computer or smart phone. The law was named "Grace's Law" to honor McComas's memory.

Committee and caucus assignments
 Member, Judiciary Committee (2019–Present)
 Chair, Civil Proceedings Subcommittee (2019–Present)
 Member, Ways and Means Committee (2003–14)
 Education subcommittee (2003–04)
 Tax & revenue subcommittee (2004–06) 
 Vice-chair's subcommittee (2007–14)
 Chair, Election law subcommittee (2007–14), member (2003–06)
 Joint Advisory Committee on Legislative Data Systems (2007–14) 
 Member, Special Committee on Higher Education Affordability and Accessibility (2003–04) 
 Member, Maryland Green Caucus (2003–14)
 Chair, Maryland Bicycle and Pedestrian Caucus (2005–14)
 Member, Maryland Veterans Caucus (2006–14)

Legislative notes
Voted for the Fairness for All Marylanders Act of 2014 (SB212)
Sponsored "Revenge Porn" Criminal Law (HB64)
Sponsored Breanna's Law (HB1366)
Supported the legalization of medical marijuana and the decriminalization of marijuana in small amounts
Sponsored the Good Samaritan Limited Overdose Immunity (HB416)
Supported the repeal of the death penalty in Maryland
Sponsored Grace's Law (HB396)
Voted for the Highway Safety Act of 2013 (SB715)
Voted for the Clean Indoor Air Act of 2007 (HB359)
Voted in favor of the Maryland Gang Prosecution Act of 2007 (SB632)
 Voted in favor of in-state tuition for undocumented immigrants in 2007 (HB6)
 Voted in favor of increasing the sales tax whilst simultaneously reducing income tax rates for some income brackets - Tax Reform Act of 2007(HB2)
 Voted in favor of Slots (HB4) in the 2007 Special session
 Voted in favor of legalizing Same-sex marriage.

In the news
In August 2009, Delegate Cardin was criticized for using Baltimore Police Department resources to perform a marriage proposal prank.  Cardin was using a friend's boat when police boarded the boat as a Foxtrot helicopter hovered above the boat.  According to The Baltimore Sun, Cardin's girlfriend thought she was going to be arrested when Cardin proposed to her.  After the issue became public, Delegate Cardin promised to reimburse the City of Baltimore for the costs incurred. Cardin paid $300 to the Baltimore Police Department to cover the costs and donated $1,000 to the city's mounted unit.

Electoral history
2018 General Election Results for Maryland House of Delegates – District 11
Voters to choose three:
{| class="wikitable"
!Name
!Votes
!Percent
!Outcome
|-
|-
|Jon S. Cardin (D)
|33,077
|  29.3%
|   Won
|-
|-
|Shelly L. Hettleman (D)
|31,957
|  28.3%
|   Won
|-
|-
|Dana Stein (D)
|30,364
|  26.9%
|   Won
|-
|-
|Jonathan Porter (R)
|16,852
|  14.9%
|   Lost
|-
|-
|Other write-ins
|521
|  0.5%
|   Lost
|-
|}
2014 Primary Election Results for Maryland Attorney General
Voters to choose one:
{| class="wikitable"
!Name
!Votes
!Percent
!Outcome
|-
|-
|Aisha Braveboy (D)
|92,664
|  20.1%
|   Lost
|-
|-
|Jon S. Cardin (D)
|139,582
|  30.3%
|   Lost
|-
|-
|Brian Frosh (D)
|228,260
|  49.6%
|   Won
|-
|}
2010 General Election Results for Maryland House of Delegates – District 11
Voters to choose three:
{| class="wikitable"
!Name
!Votes
!Percent
!Outcome
|-
|-
|Jon S. Cardin (D)
|32,211
|  24.33%
|   Won
|-
|-
|Dan K. Morhaim (D)
|28,129
|  21.25%
|   Won
|-
|-
|Dana Stein (D)
|28,034
|  21.17%
|   Won
|-
|-
|Carol C. Byrd (R)
|13,952
|  10.54%
|   Lost
|-
|-
|J. Michael Collins (R)
|13,971
|  10.55%
|   Lost
|-
|-
|Steven J. Smith (R)
|13,647
|  10.31%
|   Lost
|-
|-
|Brandon Brooks (L)
|2,341
|  1.77%
|   Lost
|-
|-
|Other write-ins
|115
|  0.09%
|   Lost
|-
|}
2010 Primary Election Results for Maryland House of Delegates – District 11
Voters to choose three:
{| class="wikitable"
!Name
!Votes
!Percent
!Outcome
|-
|-
|Jon S. Cardin (D)
|13,539
|  33.97%
|   Won
|-
|-
|Regg Hatcher (D)
|3,037
|  7.62%
|   Lost
|-
|-
|Dan K. Morhaim (D)
|11,422
|  28.66%
|   Won
|-
|-
|Dana Stein (D)
|11,855
|  29.75%
|   Won
|}

2006 General Election Results for Maryland House of Delegates – District 11
Voters to choose three:
{| class="wikitable"
!Name
!Votes
!Percent
!Outcome
|-
|-
|Jon S. Cardin (D)
|32,747
|  25.8%
|   Won
|-
|-
|Dan K. Morhaim (D)
|31,185
|  24.6%
|   Won
|-
|-
|Dana Stein (D)
|30,481
|  24.0%
|   Won
|-
|-
|Patrick V. Dyer (R)
|13,904
|  11.0%
|   Lost
|-
|-
|Patrick Abbondandalo (R)
|12,822
|  10.1%
|   Lost
|-
|-
|Dave Goldsmith (G)
|5,435
|  4.3%
|   Lost
|-
|Other Write-Ins
|181
|  0.1%
|   Lost
|}

2006 Primary Election Results for Maryland House of Delegates – District 11
Voters to choose three:
{| class="wikitable"
!Name
!Votes
!Percent
!Outcome
|-
|-
|Jon S. Cardin (D)
|11,815
|  22.5%
|   Won
|-
|-
|Dan K. Morhaim (D)
|10,146
|  19.3%
|   Won
|-
|-
|Dana Stein (D)
|6,824
|  13.0%
|   Won
|-
|-
|Rick Yaffe (D)
|6,634
|  12.6%
|   Lost
|-
|-
|Sharon H. Bloom (D)
|4,436
|  8.4%
|   Lost
|-
|-
|Jason A. Frank (D)
|3,300
|  6.3%
|   Lost
|-
|-
|Julian Earl Jones (D)
|3,291
|  6.3%
|   Lost
|-
|-
|Theodore Levin (D)
|2,271
|  4.3%
|   Lost
|-
|-
|Noel Levy (D)
|1,075
|  2.0%
|   Lost
|-
|-
|Stephen Knable (D)
|979
|  1.9%
|   Lost
|-
|-
|Zhanna Anapolsy-Maydanich (D)
|672
|  1.3%
|   Lost
|-
|-
|Ivan Goldstein (D)
|579
|  1.1%
|   Lost
|-
|-
|V. Michael Koyfman (D)
|526
|  1.0%
|   Lost
|}

2002 General Election Results for Maryland House of Delegates – District 11
Voters to choose three:
{| class="wikitable"
!Name
!Votes
!Percent
!Outcome
|-
|-
|Bobby A. Zirkin (D)
|30,467
|  23.50%
|   Won
|-
|-
|Jon S. Cardin (D)
|29,480
|  22.73%
|   Won
|-
|-
|Dan K. Morhaim (D)
|28,098
|  21.67%
|   Won
|-
|-
|J. Michael Collins, Sr. (R)
|14,601
|  11.26%
|   Lost
|-
|-
|Betty L. Wagner (R)
|13,483
|  10.40%
|   Lost
|-
|-
|Grant Harding (R)
|13,411
|  10.34%
|   Lost
|-
|Other Write-Ins
|130
|  0.10%
|   Lost
|}

2002 Primary Election Results for Maryland House of Delegates – District 11
Voters to choose three:
{| class="wikitable"
!Name
!Votes
!Percent
!Outcome
|-
|-
|Bobby A. Zirkin (D)
|10,198
|  22.9%
|   Won
|-
|-
|Dan K. Morhaim (D)
|7,922
|  17.8%
|   Won
|-
|-
|Jon S. Cardin (D)
|7,776
|  17.4%
|   Won
|-
|-
|Dana Stein (D)
|6,576
|  14.8%
|   Lost
|-
|-
|Melvin Mintz (D)
|6,311
|  14.2%
|   Lost
|-
|-
|Theodore Levin (D)
|3,349
|  7.5%
|   Lost
|-
|-
|Barney J. Wilson (D)
|2,438
|  5.5%
|   Lost
|}

References

External links

 

1970 births
Living people
Democratic Party members of the Maryland House of Delegates
Tufts University alumni
University of Maryland, Baltimore County alumni
University of Maryland Francis King Carey School of Law alumni
People from Owings Mills, Maryland
21st-century American politicians
Cardin family